Campus on the March is a short propaganda film produced by the Office of War Information in 1942.

The twenty-minute film exhaustively list the number of institutions of higher learning and many different war activities that have begun at each, including the University of Texas, Texas A&M, Harvard, Dartmouth College and the University of California. There are many different shots of ROTC units and auxiliary formations. Many men are in the military and in college at the same time. Among the war related classes and activities:

Farm labor
mechanical engineering
International relations
world languages
chemical weapons preparations
aviation
wartime nutrition
broadcast in Spanish to Latin America to further "understanding of the United Nations cause"
cryptography
celestial navigation
and various war industrial related training

See also
 List of American films of 1942
List of Allied propaganda films of World War II
United States home front during World War II

External links
 

1942 films
American World War II propaganda shorts
American black-and-white films
American short documentary films
1942 documentary films
1940s English-language films
1940s American films
1940s short documentary films